Eastman Narangoda is the current Chairman of  George Steuart Finance & former Chairman of Seylan Bank of Sri Lanka.

Early life and education
After receiving his education from Nalanda College Colombo, he entered University of Ceylon, Peradeniya graduating with a  Special BA Degree in Economics (specializing in banking & currency). He excelled in sports at Nalanda being a fine cricketer representing First XI during 1965 to 1967.

Career

Later after he graduated with an Economics Special Degree he joined National Savings Bank as an executive in 1975. Before being appointed to the current position he has been the General Manager / Chief Executive Officer for over five years for National Savings Bank (Sri Lanka).

Eastman is a council member / fellow of Association of Professional Bankers of Sri Lanka and Sri Lanka Institute of Training and Development.

Seylan Bank 
Narangoda was a talented high qualified veteran in the banking industry who was also instrumental in Seylan Bank's resilient performance after the bank saw almost a collapse that would have affected and ended the growth of the bank. The aggressive approach of the bank and due to the unethical behaviour, frauds and allegations of Golden Key Credit Card Company, which was a subsidiary of Ceylinco Consolidated in early 2000s left the bank in a financial crisis.

Narangoda was a member of the team, which was appointed as the new board of directors by the Bank of Ceylon for the Seylan Bank. The eleven member team also included Pradeep Kariyawasam and R. Nadarajah. The team managed to rebuild the financial performance of the bank within a six-month time period where they were also able to do innovations for the development of the bank.

General references 

 

 

Sri Lankan Buddhists
Alumni of Nalanda College, Colombo
Sri Lankan bankers
Sri Lankan economists